The Quorn Hunt, usually called the Quorn, established in 1696, is one of the world's oldest fox hunting packs and claims to be the United Kingdom's most famous hunt. Its country is mostly in Leicestershire, together with some smaller areas of Nottinghamshire and Derbyshire. 

After the abolition of traditional fox hunting implemented by the Hunting Act 2004, the Quorn continues to go out on four days of the week during the autumn and winter months, claiming to operate within the constraints of the law.

History
The hunt traces its origins to a pack of foxhounds established in 1696 at Tooley Park, Leicestershire, by the youthful Thomas Boothby (1677–1752). Its present name comes from the village of Quorn, also known as Quorndon, where the hounds were kennelled between 1753 and 1904. They were established there by the hunt's second master, Hugo Meynell, who bought Quorndon Hall from the 4th Earl Ferrers. Following more than half a century under the leadership of Boothby, Meynell was Master for forty-seven years. He was known for his innovative mastery of fox hunting and has been called 'The Primate of the Science'. 

In 1905, new kennels and stables were built at Paudy Lane, Seagrave; these are now listed buildings. The hunt's present-day kennels are at Gaddesby Lane, Kirby Bellars, near Melton Mowbray.

Among many notable Masters was George Osbaldeston, who in 1823 became the first to return to the Mastership after having previously retired.

Before gaining its present title in the mid-19th century, the hunt was often known by the name of its Master: for instance, from 1827 to 1831 it was called 'Lord Southampton's Hounds'. Until 1884, the hounds were owned by the Master, and a change of mastership took place either by purchase or inheritance. The hounds are now said to be "owned by the country", that is, by the hunt organization.

In 1890, Algernon Burnaby and Count Eliot Zborowski together planned the Quorn Hunt's famous Midnight Steeplechase, a jumping race in the middle of the night over twelve furlongs, with the riders dressed in nightshirts and top hats and the fences lit by oil lamps. Burnaby was the triumphant winner, gaining a silver cup provided by Zborowski. The race is commemorated in sporting prints.

A Great Depression began in 1929, and subscriptions to the hunt began to fall. Burnaby, Master since 1912, recruited Sir Harold Nutting of Quenby Hall, "newly rich from bottling Guinness", as his joint Master, and quipped "We don't want your personality, we want your purse!" Jane Ridley has estimated that during the following ten years Nutting spent about £15,000 a year on the Quorn.

Three Hunt-class warships of the Royal Navy have been called , after the Hunt.

Country

The Quorn hunts in a wide area of Leicestershire, plus some coverts in Nottinghamshire and Derbyshire, stretching from just south of Nottingham to the edge of the city of Leicester and from Melton Mowbray westwards to Ashby de la Zouch. On the eastern side of the country lies a rolling open landscape, with good fences to jump, while to the west are the wooded uplands of Charnwood Forest and the Pennine Chain. The best centres are around Melton Mowbray, Leicester and Loughborough.

In 1853, the southern part of its country was separated off to form the Fernie.

The adjoining hunts are the Meynell and South Staffs (to the north west), the South Notts (to the north), the Belvoir (to the north east), the Cottesmore (to the south east), the Fernie (to the south), and the Atherstone (to the south west).

Season and supporters
Hunting takes place on Mondays, Tuesdays, Fridays and (formerly) Saturdays, in the autumn and winter months only. More open country is hunted on Mondays and Fridays, the most popular days, with usually between one hundred and one hundred and fifty mounted followers, plus about twice as many who follow hounds on foot and with cars and bicycles. The smallest number of followers is on Tuesdays. Over eight hundred farmers in the country of the Quorn allow the hunt to use their land. There is a Supporters' Association.

The hunt's 'Saturday Country' was formerly around Belton, Staunton Harold and Kingston and has its own 'Saturday Country Wire and Damage Fund'.

List of Masters

1696 to 1752: Mr Thomas Boothby
1753 to 1800: Mr Hugo Meynell
1800 to 1805: William Molyneux, 2nd Earl of Sefton
1805 to 1806: Thomas Foley, 3rd Baron Foley
1806 to 1817: Mr Thomas Assheton Smith the Younger
1817 to 1821: Mr George Osbaldeston 
1821 to 1823: Sir Bellingham Graham, 7th Baronet
1823 to 1827: Mr George Osbaldeston (again)
1827 to 1831: Charles FitzRoy, 3rd Baron Southampton
1831 to 1833: Sir Harry Goodricke
1833 to 1835: Mr Holyoake Goodricke
1835 to 1838: Mr Rowland Errington
1838 to 1839: Edward Harbord, 4th Baron Suffield
1839 to 1841: Mr Thomas Hodgson
1841 to 1847: Mr Henry Greene, of Rolleston
1847 to 1856: Sir Richard Sutton, 2nd Baronet
1856 to 1863: George Grey, 7th Earl of Stamford
1863 to 1866: Mr Samuel Clowes
1866 to 1868: The Marquess of Hastings
1868 to 1870: Mr John Chaworth Musters
1870 to 1884: Mr John Coupland
1884 to 1896: John Manners-Sutton, 3rd Baron Manners
1886 to 1893: Captain Warner (jointly)
1886 to 1893: William Byerley Paget (jointly)
1893 to 1898: Hugh Lowther, 5th Earl of Lonsdale
1898 to 1905: Captain E. ('Tommy') Burns Hartopp
1905 to 1918: Captain Francis ('Frank') Forester
1912 to 1932: Major Algernon E. Burnaby
1919 to 1928: W. E. Paget
1930 to 1940: Lt-Col. Sir Harold Nutting
1940 to 1947: Major P. Cantrell-Hubbersty (acting)
1948 to 1951: Mrs P. Cantrell-Hubbersty

1948 to 1951: Mr F. S. Mee
1948 to 1954: Ronald Strutt, 4th Baron Belper
1954 to 1960: Lt-Col. G. A. Murray-Smith
1959 to 1962: Mrs G. A. Murray-Smith
1959 to 1985: Mrs Ulrica Murray-Smith
1960 to 1962: Lt-Col. T. C. Llewellen Palmer
1960 to 1962: Captain E. O. Corsfield
1962 to 1965: Brigadier R. G. Tilney
1965 to 1972: Captain J. D. A. Keith
1972 to 1985: Captain F. G. Barker
1975 to 1983: Mr A. J. M. Teacher
1985 to 1991: Mr J. Bealby
1985 to 1991: Mr E. R. Hanbury  
1985 to 1991: Mr W. B. Hercock 
1991 to 1994: Captain Fred. G. Barker (again)
1992 to 1994: Mr A. R. Macdonald Buchanan 
1992 to 1995: Mrs D. E. H. Turner 
1992 to 2000: Mr C. H. Geary
1994 to 1995: Mr R. G. Henson 
1995 to 1996: Mr R. S. Morely 
1995 to 1996: Mr R. Carden 
1996 to 1997: Mr Robin C. Smith-Ryland 
1992 to 2000: Mr Rad T. Thomas
1998 to 2000: Mr A. W. R. Dangar 
1997 to 2003: Mr A. R. P. Carden 
2000 to 2004: Mr R. Hunnisett
2002 to 2005: Mr W. Cursham

Post-ban
Although "hunting wild mammals with a dog" was made unlawful in England and Wales by the Hunting Act 2004, which came into effect in 2005, the Quorn Hunt says that it continues to operate within the law. A number of exemptions stated in Schedule 1 of the 2004 Act permit some previously unusual forms of hunting wild mammals with dogs to continue, such as "hunting... for the purpose of enabling a bird of prey to hunt the wild mammal".

In March 2021, during a lockdown for the COVID-19 pandemic, the Quorn Hunt was strongly criticised for carrying out activities to celebrate the birthday of its master. It was reported that people and hounds travelled out of the Quorn's county to the Burley-on-the-Hill area, and apparently engaged in illegal hunting. A supporter of a neighbouring hunt called for the resignation on all Quorn Hunt masters involved in the event after showing "complete disregard and disrespect for the thousands who have died from Covid-19". The Countryside Alliance clarified that any of its members present were there in a private capacity, not representing the Alliance, adding "There is no excuse for anyone engaged in trail hunting activity during this time".

In December 2022 Quorn Hunstman Ollie Finnegan plead guilty to illegally hunting with dogs on 7th January 2022.

Quorn Hunt Ball
There is also an annual Quorn Hunt Ball. In 2014, it took place at Two Temple Place in London but there is also one hosted in Leicestershire each year.

Bibliography
William Charles Arlington Blew, The Quorn Hunt and its masters, with illustrations by Henry Alken (London: John C. Nimmo, 1899)
William Scarth Dixon, The Quorn Hunt
Lady Augusta Fane, Chit-Chat (London: Thornton Butterworth, 1926) 
Daphne Machin Goodall, Huntsmen of the Golden Age (London: H.F. & G. Witherby, 1956)
Roy Heron, Tom Firr of the Quorn, Huntsman Extraordinary (Liss: Nimrod Book Services, 1984)
Ulrica Murray-Smith, Magic of the Quorn (London: J. A. Allen & Co., 1980) 
J. Otho Paget, Memories of the Shires (Methuen, 1920, republ. 2012)
"Cecil", The Quorn Hunt: the Accustomed Places of Meeting, with Distances from Railway Stations, circa 1870

See also
List of fox hunts in the United Kingdom
English Foxhound

References

External links
quorn-hunt.co.uk - official web site
Quorn Hunt photos at Nico Morgan Media
Captain Tommy Burns Hartopp at antique-prints.co.uk

History of Leicestershire
Sport in Leicestershire
Fox hunts in the United Kingdom
Fox hunts in England